The LG VX55350 is a mobile phone used by Verizon Wireless. The phone was released on October 31, 2008, by LG. It is also used on Virgin Mobile. The phone contains the following features:

 VGA camera
 Bluetooth
 TYY capable
 keypad for quick dialing
 Front screen
 Media Center
 VZ Navigator

Carriers
 Verizon Wireless
 AT&T
 T-mobile
 Cricket Wireless

Specifications

 WAP/ Web Browser - Yes
 Text Messaging - Yes
 Picture Messaging - Yes
 Video Messaging - Yes
 Games - Yes
 Camera - VGA Camera 
 Video Capture - Yes
 Voice Memo - Yes
 Application Download - Via Media Center
 Voicemail - Yes

See also

List of LG mobile phones
LG VX8300

External links
LG Mobile Phones
Verizon Wireless
LG VX5500 on Verizon Wireless

VX5500